Franklin Burton "Dutch" Wetzel (July 7, 1893 in Columbus, Indiana – March 5, 1942 in Hollywood, California) was a right-handed outfielder who played for the St. Louis Browns from 1920 to 1921.

He made his big league debut on September 15, 1920 at the age of 27. Facing the Boston Red Sox, he came into the game as a replacement player for Baby Doll Jacobson, going 0-2 at the plate. Two days later, on September 17, he collected his first career hit. Overall, he hit .429 in seven games in 1920, walking four times and striking out only once in 21 at-bats.

In 1921, Wetzel played in 61 games for the Browns, hitting .210 in 119 at-bats. Through the month of April that year his average was .364; however it steadily declined from that point. Of his 25 hits, two were doubles and two were home runs. He played in his final big league game on October 2, 1921.

Overall, Wetzel hit .243 in 68 major league games, collecting 34 hits in 140 at-bats. He scored 21 runs and drove 15 runs in.

Though his major league career was short, Wetzel spent 13 seasons in the minor leagues, hitting .324 with 1,503 hits. In 1920 with the Flint Halligans, he hit .387 with 33 doubles, 20 triples and 12 home runs in 115 games. He hit .319 with 30 doubles, 17 triples and 12 home runs in 1924, and in 1925 with the Des Moines Demons he hit .353 with 214 hits, 40 doubles, 9 triples and 32 home runs. He had a successful 1926 as well, hitting .352 with 206 hits, 58 doubles, 15 triples and 18 home runs for the Demons. After playing in only seven games in 1927, he hit .345 with 201 hits, 61 doubles, six triples and 20 home runs for the Omaha Crickets in 1928.

References

External links

1893 births
1942 deaths
Major League Baseball outfielders
St. Louis Browns players
Minor league baseball managers
Baseball players from Indiana
People from Columbus, Indiana
Lyons Lions players
Beaumont Exporters players
Des Moines Demons players
Hollywood Stars players
Kearney Kapitalists players
Keokuk Indians players
Minneapolis Millers (baseball) players
New Orleans Pelicans (baseball) players
Oakland Oaks (baseball) players
Omaha Buffaloes players
Omaha Crickets players
Omaha Packers players
Portland Beavers players
San Antonio Indians players
Syracuse Stars (minor league baseball) players
York Prohibitionists players